Spotlight is the name given to a BBC Northern Ireland weekly current affairs programme. It debuted in 1973.

The programme is aired on BBC1 Northern Ireland at 10:35pm (and sometimes early) on Tuesday evenings, with a repeat on BBC2. It is available to UK viewers outside of Northern Ireland on BBC iPlayer for a week after the programme. The format usually consists of a half-hour report presented on a rotating basis by a small number of presenters and reporters. At present, these are Brian Hollywood, Stephen Walker, Darragh MacIntyre and Bobby Friedman. Occasionally, the programme consists of a studio format with various reports and panel discussions.

Spotlight is well known for its hard-hitting investigations and recently won a Royal Television Society award for Mandy McAuley's dog-fighting investigation.

It has launched the careers of a number of high-profile broadcasters, including Jeremy Paxman and Gavin Esler.

Spotlight at 40
On 22 October 2013, Spotlight celebrated its 40th anniversary with a special show dubbed Spotlight at 40. The show featured interviews with stars such as Gavin Esler, Patrick Kielty, Stephen Nolan and Jeremy Paxman and took a look back at the show's 40-year run including its most controversial shows.

External links

Spotlight at 40
Spotlight on the Troubles: A Secret History

BBC Northern Ireland television shows
Current affairs shows
1990s television series from Northern Ireland
2000s television series from Northern Ireland
2010s television series from Northern Ireland
2020s television series from Northern Ireland